Fox 45 may refer to one of the following television stations in the United States affiliated with the Fox Broadcasting Company:
WBFF, Baltimore, Maryland
WKEF-DT2, a digital subchannel of WKEF in Dayton, Ohio